HP3 or variant, may refer to:

 HP3, a postcode for Hemel Hempstead, see HP postcode area
 hP3, a Pearson symbol
 Harry Potter and the Prisoner of Azkaban, the third Harry Potter novel
 Harry Potter and the Prisoner of Azkaban (film), the third Harry Potter film
 Handley Page Type C aka H.P.3, an airplane
 HP-3, a glider designed by Richard Schreder
 HP3, a type of photographic stock, see Ilford HP
 HP3, Heat Flow and Physical Properties Package, an instrument aboard the InSight Mars lander

See also
HP (disambiguation)